Optomen is an independent television production company, with Optomen Television Ltd. for the United Kingdom and Optomen Productions Inc. (launched in 2002) for the United States.

Broadcasting

United Kingdom and the United States

Optomen produces a variety of television shows for UK broadcasters including BBC, ITV, Channel 4, Sky1, Good Food and Discovery. In the US, Optomen has produced directly for, or co-produced with, Fox, HBO, A&E, Discovery, TLC, PBS, and Food Network.

International

Optomen International is its distribution arm which sells its completed programmes worldwide, the most popular being The F Word, Kitchen Nightmares, Great British Menu, and Police Camera Action!.

List of programmes

Publications

Optomen has also published books to accompany the following programmes: The F Word, Great British Menu, Kitchen Nightmares, Two Fat Ladies, and The Naked Chef.

Awards
The company has won many awards over the years, including an International Emmy, three BAFTAs, three Royal Television Society awards, three Indie awards, and two Glenfiddich awards.

Sale to All3Media

On 13 August 2010, it was announced that Optomen had been acquired by All3Media in a £40 million takeover. The agreement saw All3Media take control of Optomen along with its New York-based subsidiary Optomen Productions Inc and One Potato Two Potato, which was established as a joint venture with Gordon Ramsay.

References

Companies based in the London Borough of Camden
Companies based in New York City
All3Media